Saccharomyceta is a clade of fungi containing Pezizomycotina and Saccharomycotina, or all Ascomycete fungi except Taphrinomycotina according to the 2007 fungal phylogeny  "The Mycota: A Comprehensive Treatise on Fungi as Experimental Systems for Basic and Applied Research" and Tedersoo et al. 2018.

See also
 Ascomycota

References

Ascomycota
Opisthokont unranked clades